Avalokitesvara, also known as Bu Ken Qu Guan Yin (literally "the Guanyin who refuses to leave"), is a 2013 Chinese religious film directed by Zhang Xin. It is loosely based on a legend about how Mount Putuo in China's Zhejiang Province became the bodhimaṇḍa of the bodhisattva Avalokiteśvara, who is better known in Chinese as Guanyin. The film starred Li Chun, Nie Yuan, Nakaizumi Hideo, Siqin Gaowa, Nakano Ryoko and Mou Fengbin in the leading roles. It was shown at the 37th Montreal World Film Festival in 2013 and was named one of the four World Greats.

Plot
The film is set in China during the reign of Emperor Wuzong of the Tang dynasty. Li Yi, the Prince Guang, a relative of the emperor, has been sickly since childhood. His mother, Lady Zheng, commissions Yu Xiufeng, a craftsman from Mount Meicen, to create a porcelain figurine of Guanyin so that she can pray to the bodhisattva to bless her son with good health. On the day the figurine is completed, Yu Xiufeng and his grandson, Haisheng, discover a baby girl in a lotus pond. Yu Xiufeng adopts the baby girl as his granddaughter and names her "Lianmei" ("lotus sister"). The figurine is taken to Mount Wutai and enshrined in a Buddhist temple there.

In 845 CE, Emperor Wuzong orders the Great Anti-Buddhist Persecution because he thinks that Buddhism is corrupting the masses. He also senses that Prince Guang will become a threat to him, so he sends General Yuchi to assassinate the prince. At the same time, the Reverend Wuchen asks Yu Xiufeng to collect the figurine from Mount Wutai and hide it at Mount Meicen. During the journey, Yu Xiufeng and his grandchildren meet Egaku, a Japanese Buddhist monk sent by Empress Tachibana to find and bring the figurine to Japan. As Lady Zheng had secretly tasked General Yuchi's deputy, General Sima, with protecting her son, Sima saves Prince Guang when Yuchi is about to kill him. Sima defeats Yuchi in a duel and wants to finish him off, but Lianmei stops him and asks him to spare Yuchi. Prince Guang and Sima accompany Yu Xiufeng, Lianmei and Haisheng as they bring the figurine back to Mount Meicen. Egaku finds out later and makes his way to Mount Meicen too.

Yuchi tracks down Prince Guang with the help of the governor of Mingzhou. Lianmei and Haisheng disguise themselves as Prince Guang and Sima in order to lure Yuchi to chase them, while the real Prince Guang and Sima use the opportunity to escape. Yu Xiufeng stays behind to distract Governor Song, who kills him when refuses to reveal the prince's whereabouts. Yuchi finds out that he has been tricked so he stops chasing Lianmei and Haisheng. In the meantime, Egaku finds the figurine and tries to sneak away with it. When Haisheng and Lianmei return home, they are horrified to see their grandfather dead. Haisheng sees Egaku fleeing and immediately suspects that Egaku killed his grandfather and stole the figurine, so he chases Egaku, catches up with him, and starts beating him. Lianmei stops Haisheng and tells him she believes Egaku when he claims he is innocent. However, she refuses to let Egaku take the figurine with him. Egaku feels so ashamed of himself that he gives up and returns to Japan.

Lianmei and Haisheng are captured later at a roadblock in Mingzhou by the governor, who seizes the figurine from them. The governor then tries to bribe Yuchi to help him cover up for his failure to hunt down Prince Guang, but Yuchi refuses and accuses him of corruption. Meanwhile, Haisheng escapes from the prison and drags Lianmei along with him. Yuchi is furious when he learns of their escape and orders the other prisoners to be executed. However, Lianmei succeeds in convincing Haisheng to go back to the prison with her because she knows what would happen if they escaped. Yuchi is so impressed by Lianmei's act of self-sacrifice that he spares the prisoners.

Yuchi sets a trap to lure Prince Guang out of hiding. He announces that Lianmei and Haisheng will be executed for helping a fugitive escape, and predicts that Prince Guang will come to save them. As expected, the prince appears and turns himself in to Yuchi in exchange for Lianmei and Haisheng's release. However, Sima also shows up and fights with Yuchi and his soldiers to save Prince Guang. Just then, a messenger arrives with an imperial edict announcing that Emperor Wuzong is dead and that Prince Guang will succeed him. Yuchi commits suicide in shame for failing to complete his mission. Prince Guang returns to the palace for his coronation, while Lianmei and Haisheng bring the figurine back to Mount Wutai.

Egaku travels to China again later to ask for the figurine. The Reverend Wuchen initially rejects his request. However, Egaku eventually manages to convince everyone of his sincerity by kneeling outside the temple for several days, so Wuchen allows him to bring the figurine to Japan. When Egaku's ship sails past Mount Meicen, Lianmei rows towards the ship on a raft because she cannot bear to see the figurine leave. A fierce storm suddenly breaks out and causes the figurine to be cast overboard. When the storm has subsided, Egaku is deeply saddened to learn that Lianmei and the figurine are lost at sea. Just then, lotuses appear all over the water surface. Egaku sees a vision of Lianmei as Guanyin on Mount Meicen, and realises that he is not destined to bring the figurine back to Japan. However, he can bring back the virtues embodied by the bodhisattva – such as compassion and mercy – and impart them to his people.

Cast
 Li Chun as Lianmei, the human incarnation of Avalokiteśvara (Guanyin).
 Nie Yuan as Li Yi, the Prince Guang, a prince and relative of Emperor Wuzong. He becomes the new Emperor after Emperor Wuzong's death.
 Nakaizumi Hideo as Egaku, a Japanese Buddhist monk tasked with finding the Guanyin figurine and bringing it back to Japan.
 Siqin Gaowa as Lady Zheng, Prince Guang's mother.
 Nakano Ryoko as Empress Tachibana, the Empress of Japan.
 Mou Fengbin as General Yuchi, a general sent by Emperor Wuzong to assassinate Prince Guang.
 Wang Zengqi as Haisheng, Yu Xiufeng's grandson.
 Niu Ben as Yu Xiufeng, a craftsman who created the porcelain figurine. He adopts Lianmei as his granddaughter.
 Sang Weilin as General Sima, a general secretly tasked by Lady Zheng to protect Prince Guang.
 Kuroki Shinji as Aoki, a Japanese Buddhist monk who follows Egaku to ask for the figurine.
 Fang Xinmin as Reverend Wuchen, the abbot of the Buddhist temple on Mount Wutai.
 Zhang Shengbao as Governor Song, the governor of Mingzhou (modern Ningbo).
 Ying Lizhi as Eunuch Ma, a eunuch who serves Emperor Wuzong.
 Wang Jianguo as a fisherman

Production
Avalokitesvara was approved by China's State Administration for Religious Affairs and State Administration of Press, Publication, Radio, Film and Television before it starting filming on 6 June 2012 at Mount Putuo, Zhejiang Province. It opened in Chinese theatres on 26 July 2013.

Venerable Master Yicheng, a former President of the Buddhist Association of China, served as principal consultant for the film.

Awards
Avalokitesvara was shown at the 37th Montreal World Film Festival in 2013. It was named one of the World Greats along with Mitani Kōki's The Kiyosu Conference, Wang Jing's Fall of Ming, and Ren Pengyuan's The Deadly Bullet.

References

External links
 

2013 films
Films about Buddhism
Metaphysical fiction films
2010s historical adventure films
Chinese historical adventure films
Films set in 9th-century Tang dynasty
Films shot in Zhejiang
Films set in Zhejiang
Films set in Shanxi